Junain is a settlement in Uribia Municipality, La Guajira Department, in Colombia.

Climate
Junain has a hot arid climate (Köppen BWh) with little to no rainfall in all months except October and November.

References

Populated places in the Guajira Department